Dröge is a surname. Notable people with the surname include:

 Gert-Jan Dröge (1943–2007), Dutch television presenter 
 Katharina Dröge (born 1984), German politician
 Markus Dröge (born 1954), German Lutheran bishop

See also
 Pete Droge (born 1969), American musician
 Wolfgang Droege (1949–2005), Canadian white supremacist